Françoise Durocher, Waitress is a 1972 Canadian dramatic television film, directed by André Brassard. The film presents a portrait of Françoise Durocher, a waitress at a diner in Quebec, as portrayed by 24 different actresses and one male actor in drag over the course of seven monologues.

The performers playing Durocher over the course of the film include Odette Gagnon, Rita Lafontaine, Christine Olivier, Louisette Dussault, Sophie Clément, Luce Guilbeault, Michelle Rossignol, Frédérique Collin, Carmen Tremblay, Hélène Loiselle, Amulette Garneau, Monique Mercure, Mirielle Lachance, Sylvie Heppel, Denise Proulx, Denise Morelle, Ève Gagnier, Anne-Marie Ducharme, Katerine Mousseau, Véronique Le Flaguais, Angèle Coutu, Denise de Jaguère, Suzelle Collette, Huguette Gervais and Normand Morin.

The film won three Canadian Film Awards at the 24th Canadian Film Awards, for Best TV Drama, Best Direction in a Non-Feature (Brassard) and Best Screenplay in a Non-Feature (Michel Tremblay).

References

External links

1972 films
1972 short films
1972 television films
Canadian drama television films
National Film Board of Canada short films
Films directed by André Brassard
French-language Canadian films
Canadian drama short films
1970s Canadian films
Works by Michel Tremblay